Iuliu Kiss (born 1924, date of death unknown) was a Romanian footballer who played as a midfielder.

International career
Iuliu Kiss played one match for Romania, on 28 June 1953 under coach Gheorghe Popescu I in a 3–1 victory against Bulgaria at the 1954 FIFA World Cup qualifiers.

Honours
Progresul Oradea
Divizia B: 1955

Notes

References

External links
 

1924 births
Year of death missing
Romanian footballers
Romania international footballers
Place of birth missing
Association football midfielders
Liga I players
Liga II players
CA Oradea players